The Central Institute of Fisheries Education (CIFE) is a Deemed to be University and institution of higher learning for fisheries science in Mumbai, India. CIFE has over four decades of leadership in human resource development with its alumni aiding in the development of fisheries and aquaculture worldwide, producing notable contributions to research and technological advancements to its credit.

The institute is one of four deemed to be universities operating under the Indian Council for Agricultural Research (ICAR); the other three being the Indian Veterinary Research Institute (IVRI), the National Dairy Research Institute (NDRI) and the Indian Agriculture Research Institute (IARI)

A total of five centres operate under CIFE, including ones at ICAR CIFE Rohtak centre at Rohtak in Haryana state, Kolkata in West Bengal state, Kakinada in Andhra Pradesh state, Pawarkheda in Madhya Pradesh state and Motihari in Bihar state.

History 
CIFE was instituted in 1961 originally as an inservice training centre to impart proficient training and education to fisheries professionals so as to equip them to face the growing challenges in the fisheries sector. Taking its  efforts of almost twenty years into consideration, CIFE came under the administrative control of the Indian Council for Agricultural Research. It was then conferred Deemed University status in 1989 by the University Grants Commission. As such, CIFE incorporated provisions for both research and education in its mandate. It has since made significant contributions toward enriching the quality of fisheries education in India. As per the letter dated 10 November - 2017, University Grants Commission, the higher education authority, the word University has been dropped from the CIFE name and it was replaced by Deemed to be university.

Education programs 
CIFE offers Master of Fisheries Science (M.F.Sc) and PhD programs in specialised branches of fisheries science, undertakes research, conducts capacity enhancement programs, and provides technical support and consultancy to development agencies, fishers, farmers and entrepreneurs. With a team of dedicated scientists and state-of-art infrastructure facilities, CIFE is partnering the knowledge led revolution in order to create fisheries and aquaculture-based sustainable rural livelihoods and to ensure food and nutritional security.
CIFE offers M.F.Sc and Ph.D program under 11 various discipline includes: Aquaculture, Aquatic Environment Management, Aquatic Animal Health, Fisheries Resource Management, Fish Biochemistry & Physiology, Fish Nutrition & Feed Technology, Fish Genetics & Breeding, Fish Biotechnology, Fisheries Extension, Fisheries Economics and Post-Harvest Technology

References

Deemed universities in Maharashtra
Fishing in India
Fisheries and aquaculture research institutes in India
Aquaculture in India
Universities in Mumbai
1961 establishments in Maharashtra